Mario Ciocco (1907 – 24 July 1967) was a Swiss sports shooter. He competed in the 300 m rifle and the 50 m rifle events at the 1948 Summer Olympics.

References

1907 births
1967 deaths
Swiss male sport shooters
Olympic shooters of Switzerland
Shooters at the 1948 Summer Olympics
Place of birth missing